Jawahir Ahmed is a Somali-American model.

Personal life
Ahmed was born in 1991 in Logan, Utah to Somali parents. Her family had moved to the United States earlier that year as the civil war in Somalia began. Her family hails from the Osman Mahamoud sub clan of the larger Majeerteen

For her post-secondary education, Ahmed is studying at the Utah State University on a scholarship. Majoring in Health Education with a specialization in Health Sciences, she hopes to eventually serve as a health adviser for Engineers Without Borders. Ahmed is concurrently working for AmeriCorps and the CPASS college preparation program.

Career
Ahmed is signed to the Stars Talent Group modeling agency.

In 2013, she represented Somalia in the Miss Africa Utah pageant, which she wound up winning. She again served as Miss Somalia in the 2013 Miss United Nations USA pageant.

Notes

References

External links
Nation of Poets - Jawahir Ahmed

1991 births
Living people
Ethnic Somali people
American female models
American people of Somali descent
People from Logan, Utah
Somalian female models
21st-century American women